Yevgeni Vasilyevich Chernyshov (born February 22, 1947, in the village of Proletarsky, Serpukhovsky District, Moscow Oblast) is a former Soviet/Russian handball player who competed in the 1976 Summer Olympics and in the 1980 Summer Olympics.

He trained at the Armed Forces sports society in Moscow. In 1976 he won the gold medal with the Soviet team. He played all six matches and scored 16 goals.

Four years later he was part of the Soviet team which won the silver medal. He played all six matches.

References

External links
profile

1947 births
Living people
Soviet male handball players
Russian male handball players
Armed Forces sports society athletes
Handball players at the 1976 Summer Olympics
Handball players at the 1980 Summer Olympics
Olympic handball players of the Soviet Union
Olympic gold medalists for the Soviet Union
Olympic silver medalists for the Soviet Union
Olympic medalists in handball
Medalists at the 1980 Summer Olympics
Medalists at the 1976 Summer Olympics
Sportspeople from Moscow Oblast